Porazava (Porozeve) is a town in the Svislach District of Grodno Region, Belarus near the town of Svislach.

The town had a thriving Jewish community and synagagogue prior to World War II. Among those born in the town was the "mother of Yiddish theatre" Ester Rachel Kamińska. 

During World War II, Porazava was occupied by Nazi Germany from June 1941 until 15 July 1944 and administered as a part of Bezirk Bialystok.

References

External links
 Porozowo – A tribute to its former Jewish community
 Sztetl
 Parafia
 Radzima.org
 Porozów

Urban-type settlements in Belarus
Populated places in Grodno Region
Svislach District
Nowogródek Voivodeship (1507–1795)
Volkovyssky Uyezd
Białystok Voivodeship (1919–1939)